Jesper Jonasson Westermark (born 25 July 1993) is a Swedish footballer who plays for Öster as a forward.

Career
For the 2015 season, Westermark signed with Utsikten.

On 24 January 2019, Westermark officially signed with Ljungskile for one year.

For the 2021 season, Westermark joined Öster.

References

External links

1993 births
Living people
Swedish footballers
Association football forwards
BK Häcken players
IK Oddevold players
Utsiktens BK players
GAIS players
Ljungskile SK players
Östers IF players
Allsvenskan players
Ettan Fotboll players
Superettan players